{{Infobox settlement
| official_name    = Jalalpur Pirwala
| name             = 
| native_name      = Jalalpur pirwala
| imagesize        =  
| image_alt        =
| image_caption    =
| image_map        = 
| mapsize          =150px
| map_caption      =
|timezone1         = PST                                                                                                       
|utc_offset1       = +5                                                                                                       
| subdivision_type = Country
| subdivision_name =  
| subdivision_type1 =Province
| subdivision_name1 =Punjab Pakistan
| subdivision_type2 =District
| subdivision_name2 =Multan District
| subdivision_type3 =Tehsil                                                                                                       
| subdivision_name3 =Jalalpur Pirwala Tehsil                                                                                                      
| subdivision_type4 = Number of Union councils
| subdivision_name4 = 15                                                                                                      
|government_footnotes  =
|government_type       = Assistant Commissioner
|leader_title         = Chairman
|leader_name           = Mudassir Mumtaz Herl
|leader_title1         =MNA 
|leader_name1          = Rana Muhammad Qasim Noon
(NA-159)
|   
|leader_title2    =MPA
|leader_name2    =Naghma Mushtaq  
(PP-223)                                                                                       
|postal_code_type                =postal code                                                                                            
| postal_code         = 59250 
| population_total = 500,000 +
| population_as_of = 2017 census
|population_demonym=Jalalpuri                                                                                                             |coordinates =|
| nickname      =JPPW' OR "JP"                                                                           
|elevation_ footnotes=                                                       
|elevation_m =101
}}Jalalpur Pirwala''' is a city and the capital of Jalalpur Pirwala Tehsil, Multan District, Pakistan. This city is about 90 km away towards south from Multan city. Jalalpur Pirwala is a historical city and it was named after a famous Sufi saint Jalaluddin Surkh-Posh Bukhari. It had a population was over 500,000 in the 2017  census. This city is also known as the City of Peer Qatal.

The city has an agricultural background, though it has some industrial resources as well. The main sources of income in the area are agriculture and trade. A smooth income in International trade is due to many people working abroad. The economic remittances from overseas migrants living in countries like Saudi Arabia, United Arab Emirates, Oman, Qatar, the United States and the United Kingdom have also been considered great support for their families living here. There are 15 union councils in Jalalpur Pirwala tehsil. Jalalpur Pirwala is now part of CPEC (China–Pakistan Economic Corridor) via Lahore-Karachi Motorway.

Notable residents 
 Naghma Mushtaq Lang, is a politician, Ex. provincial minister and for the 3rd time & current member of the Provincial Assembly of the Punjab
Syed Ashiq Hussain Bukhari, is a politician and Ex Member of Punjab & National Assembly of Pakistan.

References

Populated places in Multan District
Tehsils of Punjab, Pakistan